Dr. Mohamed El Ghanem is an Egyptian refugee detained without charge for seven years by the Geneva judiciary, between 2007 through 2013, allegedly in retaliation for refusing to spy on Geneva's Muslim community leaders.

Dr. El Ghanem was released shortly after the Swiss Supreme Court ruled his detention wrongful, requiring he be released in October 2013.

Dr. El Ghanem was released, but remains in a different custody (2022), based on allegations made without his presence.  Suffering the effects of his wrongful confinement, he fired his own lawyers, and his situation remains principally unresolved.

Biography 
Dr. El Ghanem is a Professor of International law, having received his PhD from the University of Rome.  Dr. El Ghanem authored a 1991 book on "Terrorism and the Law".  As an Egyptian government official, he drafted much of the country's anti-terrorism legislation.

Prior to seeking asylum in Switzerland, El Ghanem was an Egyptian Government official, a Director in the Ministry of Interior, who also taught law at the police academy in Cairo. In the late 1990s, El Ghanem had differences with Egyptian government, because he refused to fabricate false charges against journalists and other dissidents.  He subsequently became the target of persecution himself for contesting the persecution of others, at which point he sought asylum first in Italy, then in Switzerland.

Human rights defender 
Before he left Egypt, Dr. El Ghanem was well known for defending the rights of Egyptian Christians (Copts) who were at the time suffering under the church-building ban of President Hosni Mubarek.  According to journalist Robert Fisk, Dr. El Ghanem's defense of Christian Copts made him a "thorn in the side of the Mubarek regime".

Mohamed El Ghanem's detention without charge in Switzerland 

In 2000, Dr. El Ghanem fled Egypt in the plane of Swiss Foreign Minister Joseph Deiss.

In 2001, Dr. El Ghanem received refugee status from the Swiss government.

In 2002, Dr. El Ghanem claims Swiss secret services began aggressively recruiting him as an informant to spy on prominent local Muslim community figures, notably Geneva imam Hani Ramadan.  At the time, a large-scale operation of spying on the Geneva-based imam called "Operation Memphis" was in-play. To the chagrin of the Swiss security services, Mr. El Ghanem refused to collaborate as an informant. As a result of his refusal, he claimed to have received severe harassment and threats by the same Swiss secret service officials. In response, Dr. El Ghanem filed charges against the Geneva police for the harassment.  Dr. El Ghanem then claims he was menaced to remove the harassment charges he had filed.

The harassment continued repeatedly and without pause. Dr. El Ghanem alleged that informants were being used in the harassment, most of them migrants.

In 2003, Dr. El Ghanem called journalist Robert Fisk in Beirut and told him of the threats and harassment he'd received from the Swiss secret services.  Robert Fisk knew Dr. El Ghanem from Egypt; had previously written articles about his Egyptian government persecution.

In 2005, Dr. El Ghanem was seated in the restaurant-cafeteria of the University of Geneva, where he was studying to gain equivalence of his law degree from the University of Rome.  Dr. El Ghanem was allegedly attacked by a Somali migrant; Dr. El Ghanem claimed he waved a butter knife at the migrant to ward him away.  Police suddenly appeared and rather than defending Dr. El Ghanem, Geneva Police arrested Mr. El Ghanem, claiming he had attacked the migrant with the knife.  Subsequent to this, Dr. El Ghanem was arrested and held without charge, for several weeks.  Written reports of the Geneva Police claim that Dr. El Ghanem had attacked and "placed a knife in the abdomen" of the migrant.  Years later, the Geneva Police officer-in-charge of the case would admit fault with his own official Police report.

In 2005, subsequent to these events Mr. El Ghanem wrote several senior Swiss officials saying that the case would have "consequences".  Dr. El Ghanem was detained on the basis of these letters, but also on official allegations that he had published angry comments online, which wound-up on jihadic websites, inciting violence against Switzerland.  Dr. El Ghanem's involvement in any such publication has never been formally proven nor publicly substantiated.  The family of Dr. El Ghanem disputes these claims, claiming Dr. El Ghanem had no ties to extremist groups, that Dr. El Ghanem sought only protection, and that Dr. El Ghanem was peacefully studying at the University of Geneva to obtain Swiss recognition of his law degree from the University of Rome when the Swiss harassment started.

Dr. El Ghanem's allegations of official harassment were never examined by Geneva Judiciary.  Instead, the court judged Mr. El Ghanem criminally irresponsible (mentally unfit and criminally dangerous) in re: charges vis-a-vis the interaction with the Somali migrant, charges which were later determined to be ill-founded (false).  This court decision taken by the Geneva Judiciary was not only based on ill-founded charges, but it was run in absentia, using a medical assessment of a doctor, who had never seen Dr. El Ghanem in person, i.e. the medical doctor had only read the allegations of the Geneva judicial police, many of which were later refuted by the Police themselves.

Subsequent to this, in 2006, the Swiss Federal Council cancelled Dr. El Ghanem's refugee status and expelled him from Switzerland, on grounds that Dr. El Ghanem was a threat to the external and internal security of the country (national security grounds).  The removal of Dr. El Ghanem's refugee status, as well as his administrative expulsion from Switzerland was performed administratively: without a hearing, and without the right to appeal.

Subsequent to this, as a refugee in Swiss 'hands', Dr. El Ghanem, who had been learning French and studying law to pass the Swiss bar-exam, was removed from housing, suddenly found his state support as a refugee arbitrarily curtailed; he was left without housing or means of sustenance.

2007: Egyptian refugee jailed in Geneva for refusing to spy for the Swiss 

In 2007, Dr. El Ghanem was jailed without charge in Champ-Dollon prison outside Geneva.  Due to this arrangement, Dr. El Ghanem has remained in prison without charge since 2007.  His family has repeatedly requested to see him, and has been repeatedly refused.

For two years the Swiss government refused to reply to Dr. El Ghanem's family's questions about his whereabouts.

In 2009, journalist Robert Fisk declared that Mohamed El Ghanem had been "disappeared" by the Swiss Government.

Possible FBI involvement in case 

In 2007, the FBI called the family of Dr. El Ghanem, who live in the United States, before they departed for Geneva to try to visit him.  This indicating FBI surveillance of his U.S.-based relatives.  Collaboration of U.S. authorities in this affair has long been suspected

The FBI is "embedded" in the Swiss Federal Department of Justice and Police, under the auspices of a 2006 bilateral treaty for joint U.S.-Swiss investigations.  Under U.S.-Swiss treaty, Swiss-based FBI activities in joint-investigations are financed by the United States, i.e. According to the treaty, if the FBI was involved in any investigation of Mr. El Ghanem, Swiss-based activities of the FBI in Mohamed El Ghanem's direction would have been paid-for by the United States Government.

FBI tactics for forced recruitment to spying on Muslim leaders are well-known, having been reported on extensively by the ACLU and U.S. news outlets such as CNN.  U.S. Muslims  who have refused FBI spy recruitment have been subjected to severe harassment, threats, arbitrary arrest,.  The U.S. organization Council on American–Islamic Relations (CAIR) has complained repeatedly about FBI threats, coercion and deportation of U.S.-based Muslims who have refused to spy for the FBI.

2010: Lawyers raise case before the UN Committee on Enforced and Voluntary Disappearances 

In 2009, Dr. El Ghanem submitted a pro se application for habeas corpus.  This was ignored by the Geneva Court.

In 2010, lawyers for Dr. El Ghanem raised the case before the Office of the United Nations High Commissioner for Human Rights, Committee for  "Enforced and Voluntary Disappearances".  The Swiss response to the UN was to state that Dr. El Ghanem was incarcerated due to his "dangerousness".

Dr. El Ghanem had undertaken several hunger strikes during his imprisonment; he was already suffering from heart problems.

By 2011, Dr. El Ghanem had suffered severe medical problems in prison.

By 2012, his lawyer had stated that he "almost died" due to his imprisonment.

2012: Swiss Activists and Egyptian Government ask Swiss Government for answers 

By 2012, the local press were accusing the Geneva judiciary of attempting to bury their mistakes by keeping Dr. El Ghanem in prison, and noting that El Ghanem's incarceration was damaging the image of Switzerland abroad

Swiss activists were also angrily protesting for his release, holding Guantanemo-style sit-ins, in front of the Office of the United Nations High Commissioner for Human Rights in Geneva.

Also by 2012, the new Egyptian Government was asking the Swiss government to explain their treatment of a man who had sought refuge from the Mubarek regime.  This was in response to a number of riots which were held in Cairo, protesting the wrongful incarceration of Dr. El Ghanem.  In response to these official Egyptian queries, and the activity of local Swiss activists, the Swiss Parliament was discussing the topic.

2013: Swiss Supreme Court orders the release of Dr. El Ghanem 

By mid-2012, lawyers for Dr. El Ghanem raised a case before the Swiss Supreme Court (Tribunal Federal) requesting that a new analysis of the case be held.

In January 2013, the Swiss Supreme Court (Tribunal federal) ruled for the release of Dr. El Ghanem.

In June 2013, the Geneva Judiciary appealed the ruling on Dr. El Ghanem's release.

In October 2013, the Swiss Supreme Court (Tribunal federal) ruled for the release of Dr. El Ghanem.

As-from November 2013, Dr. El Ghanem remains in non-criminal custody.

Articles about the case 
 THE INDEPENDENT: Robert Fisk’s World: The curious case of the missing Egyptian and the Swiss police, The Independent, 29 August 2009
 THE INDEPENDENT: Robert Fisk’s World: Jailed in Geneva: The Colonel Who Stood up to Mubarek but Refused to Spy for the Swiss, Robert Fisk, The Independent, March 5, 2012
 LEMAN BLUE (Swiss Television) Discussion of El Ghanem Case
 Interview with Brother of Dr. El Ghanem (Part in English, part in French)

See also 
 Forced disappearance
 Indefinite detention
 Switzerland
 Geneva
 Coercion

External links
OHCHR - Official site
 UN Committee on Enforced Disappearances
UN Declaration on the Right and Responsibility of Individuals, Groups and Organs of Society to Promote and Protect Universally Recognized Human Rights and Fundamental Freedoms
Who is a defender (OHCHR)
International Service for Human Rights: Working to support Human Rights Defenders
Amnesty International: Protecting Human Rights Defenders
Front Line: The International Foundation for the Protection of Human Rights Defenders at Risk
International Federation for Human Rights - Human rights defenders programme of FIDH
The Human rights defenders programme of the OMCT

References 

Living people
Egyptian refugees
20th-century Egyptian lawyers
Egyptian human rights activists
21st-century Swiss lawyers
Year of birth missing (living people)